The Nude Woman (French: La femme nue) is a 1932 French drama film directed by Jean-Paul Paulin and starring Florelle, Raymond Rouleau and Constant Rémy. The film is based on a play by Henry Bataille which has been adapted on several occasions.

The film's sets were designed by Lazare Meerson.

Cast
 Florelle as Lolette  
 Raymond Rouleau as Pierre Bernier  
 Constant Rémy as Jean Rouchard  
 Armand Bour as Prince de Chabran  
 Maxime Fabert as Tabourot  
 Alice Field as Princesse de Chabran  
 Marcel de Garcin as Gréville  
 Paul Clerget as Garzini  
 Odette Talazac as Mme. Garzin 
 Robert Charlet 
 Lucy Clorival 
 Fanny Lacroix 
 Louis Merlac

See also
 The Naked Truth (1914)
 The Nude Woman (1922)
 The Nude Woman (1926)

References 
Notes

Bibliography
 Crisp, Colin. Genre, Myth and Convention in the French Cinema, 1929-1939. Indiana University Press, 2002.

External links 
 

1932 films
1932 drama films
French drama films
1930s French-language films
Films directed by Jean-Paul Paulin
French films based on plays
Sound film remakes of silent films
French black-and-white films
1930s French films